Murray McElwain Roy Baron (born June 1, 1967) is a Canadian former professional ice hockey defenceman who played 15 seasons in the National Hockey League (NHL) for the Philadelphia Flyers, St. Louis Blues, Montreal Canadiens, Phoenix Coyotes, and Vancouver Canucks.

Playing career 
Baron was drafted by the Philadelphia Flyers in the eighth round, 167th overall, of the 1986 NHL Entry Draft.

Coaching career 
In 2011, Baron began his coaching career as an assistant coach with the Kootenay International Junior Hockey League's Kamloops Storm. He also coaches for Kamloops Minor Hockey.

Career statistics

Regular season and playoffs

References

External links
 

1967 births
Canadian ice hockey defencemen
Canadian people of Ukrainian descent
Hershey Bears players
Living people
Montreal Canadiens players
Richmond Sockeyes players
Sportspeople from Prince George, British Columbia
Philadelphia Flyers draft picks
Philadelphia Flyers players
Phoenix Coyotes players
St. Louis Blues players
North Dakota Fighting Hawks men's ice hockey players
Vancouver Canucks players
Vernon Lakers players
NCAA men's ice hockey national champions